The Body Lovers (1967) is Mickey Spillane's tenth book featuring private investigator Mike Hammer.

Plot summary
This story opens with Mike Hammer moving through the dark streets of the city when he hears a child emit a terrible scream of fear. When he finds the child he also discovers the nude body of a murdered beautiful woman who had been beaten to death with a whip. This begins a complicated and baffling case involving the deaths of a few more women, a murdered newspaper reporter who was tracking some aspects of the case and the sordid life of the prostitutes in the city.
The newspaper reporter community and the police department ally themselves with Hammer, but despite all the effort, there are few clues, so in typical Hammer style, Mike creates them. He plays the white knight to some women who have reached the depths, pounding a pimp who regularly beat his women into a bloody pulp in order to make the point. Mike uncovers a sadistic ring made up of international figures where women at a low point risk their lives for a fortune in a desperate attempt to pull themselves up. In the end, Velda comes through for Mike and he defeats the ring by literally blowing it away.

1967 American novels
Novels by Mickey Spillane
E. P. Dutton books
Mike Hammer (character) novels